Metaphysical Interior with Biscuits is a 1916 painting by Italian metaphysical painter Giorgio de Chirico. It is one of the earliest editions in a series of works that extended late into Chirico's career.

Like the others in this series, this painting depicts a room cluttered with objects in a surreal arrangement. In this case the main focus is a panel on which are mounted several biscuits (crackers) arranged to resemble an abstract face. Behind this panel is a picture in an irregularly shaped frame. The image in the frame is an architectural scene in the style of de Chirico's earlier work.

External links
 Metaphysical Interior with Biscuits on Menil Collection

1916 paintings
Paintings by Giorgio de Chirico